The Swainsboro Light and Water Plant in Swainsboro in Emanuel County, Georgia was listed on the National Register of Historic Places in 2004.  The listing included three contributing buildings and three contributing structures.

The power plant building was built in 1922.

References

National Register of Historic Places in Emanuel County, Georgia
Buildings and structures completed in 1921
Buildings and structures in Emanuel County, Georgia
1921 establishments in Georgia (U.S. state)